Kochkar (Qusqar) is a rural locality (a khutor) in Voskresensky Selsoviet, Meleuzovsky District, Bashkortostan, Russia. The population was 32 as of 2010. There is 1 street.

Geography 
Kochkar is located 22 km northeast of Meleuz (the district's administrative centre) by road. Smakovo is the nearest rural locality.

References 

Rural localities in Meleuzovsky District